Kliment Voroshilov (1881–1961) was a prominent Soviet military officer and politician.

Voroshilov may also refer to:
Voroshilov (surname)
Voroshilov, former name of Ussuriysk, Primorsky Krai, Russia
Kliment Voroshilov tank, a Soviet tank series
Soviet cruiser Voroshilov, a Kirov class cruiser
Soviet cruiser Marshal Voroshilov, a Kresta II-class cruiser